This is  a list of copper production by company.

2020

2016

2012

2010

See also

List of countries by copper production
List of copper mines

References

Copper mining companies
Mining-related lists
Lists of companies